Ringebu Station is a railway station located at the village of Ringebu, Norway. The station is located on the Dovre Line and served express trains to Oslo and Trondheim. The station was opened in 1896 when the Dovre Line was extended from Tretten to Otta.

The station restaurant was taken over by Norsk Spisevognselskap on 1 January 1926. It was transferred back to private operation from 1932, but then again operated by Spisevognselskapet from 15 March 1942.

References

External links

 Jernbaneverket page on Ringebu

Railway stations in Oppland
Railway stations on the Dovre Line
Railway stations opened in 1896
1896 establishments in Norway
Ringebu